Esther Sittler (born 9 May 1952) is a member of the Senate of France, representing the Bas-Rhin department.  She is a member of the Union for a Popular Movement.

An administrative secretary by profession, she was elected Senator September 26, 2004 and February 20, 2005. Her position remained vacant from November 27, 2004 to February 19, 2005, following a cancellation of the vote.

Current positions

 2008 - 2014 : Mayor of Herbsheim
 2004 - 2013 : Senator of Bas-Rhin (re-elected in 2005 following the vote cancellation)

Former positions

 1995 - 2001 : Mayor of Herbsheim
 1989 - 1995 : Mayor of Herbsheim
 1983 - 1989 : Mayor of Herbsheim

References
Page on the Senate website
nossenateurs.fr

1952 births
Living people
Union for a Popular Movement politicians
The Social Right
French Senators of the Fifth Republic
Mayors of places in Grand Est
Women mayors of places in France
Women members of the Senate (France)
21st-century French women politicians
Senators of Bas-Rhin